Lupin Mine was a gold mine in Nunavut, Canada. It opened in 1982 and was originally owned and operated by Echo Bay Mines Limited, who in 2003 became a fully owned subsidiary of Kinross Gold Corporation.

The mine ceased production briefly in August 2003, but was restarted in early 2004 to recover old stope pillars with a reduced crew. The mine closed again in February 2005 and, in 2006, the assets were sold to Wolfden Resources Limited (later MMG, Ltd.) and subsequently to Elgin Mining, Inc. of Canada in July 2011. Elgin states that the mine is currently on care and maintenance due to the low price of gold, and that "The mill and all associated infrastructure was properly decommissioned and are in good condition for re-commencement of operations" should market conditions prove favorable.

During the winter, the mine is served by the Tibbitt to Contwoyto Winter Road.

In January 2015 WPC Resources of Vancouver optioned the property from Toronto-based Mandalay Resources who had purchased Elgin Assets.

Climate
Lupin has a subarctic climate (Köppen Dfc) dominated by the cold and prolonged winter. Summers are short, but mild enough to bring it above a polar classification.

References

Mines in Nunavut
Gold mines in Canada
Kitikmeot Region
Underground mines in Canada
Former mines in Canada
Former populated places in the Kitikmeot Region